William or Bill Murray may refer to:

Nobility
William Murray, 2nd Earl of Tullibardine (c. 1574–1626), Scottish landowner
William Murray, 1st Earl of Dysart (1600?–1655), Scottish nobleman and whipping-boy to King Charles I of England
William Murray, 2nd Lord Nairne (c. 1665–1726), Scottish peer and Jacobite
William Murray, Marquess of Tullibardine (1689–1746), Jacobite 
William Murray, 1st Earl of Mansfield (1705–1793), British jurist
William Murray, 4th Earl of Mansfield (1806–1898), British nobleman
William Murray, 5th Earl of Mansfield (1860–1906), British nobleman, Earl of Mansfield
William Murray, 8th Earl of Mansfield (1930–2015), Scottish nobleman and Conservative politician
William Keith Murray (1801–1861), Scottish peer, landowner and soldier

Sports

Association football
Bill Murray (footballer, born 1898), English footballer
Bill Murray (footballer, born 1901) (1901–?), Scottish football player and manager (Sunderland AFC)
Bill Murray (footballer, born 1904) (1904–?), Scottish footballer
Billy Murray (footballer) (1922–1992), English footballer (Manchester City)
Willie Murray (footballer, born 1954), Scottish footballer who played in the 1974 Scottish League Cup Final
Willie Murray (footballer, born 1881) (1881–1929), Scottish footballer for Sunderland

Other sports
Bill Murray (baseball) (1893–1943), American professional baseball infielder
Billy Murray (boxer) (1892–1926), American boxer
Billy Murray (baseball) (1864–1937), American baseball manager
W. H. Murray (William Hutchison Murray, 1913–1996), Scottish mountain climber and writer
Bill Murray (offensive lineman) (born 1997), American football player
William D. Murray (1908–1986), head football coach at University of Delaware from 1940 to 1950 and Duke University from 1951 to 1965
William Murray (Irish athlete) (1881–1942), Irish athlete at the 1908 Olympic Games
William Murray (Australian athlete) (1882–1977), Australian athlete at the 1912 Olympic Games
William Murray (rugby union) (1894–?), Scottish international rugby union player
Willie Murray (bowls) (born 1940), Irish lawn and indoor bowler

Politics
William Murray (Australian politician) (1890–1980), New South Wales politician
William Murray (Dumfriesshire MP) (1865–1923), British MP for Dumfriesshire, 1918–1922
William Murray (New Brunswick politician) (1857–?), Canadian politician
William Murray (Newcastle-under-Lyme MP) (1796–?), British MP for Newcastle-under-Lyme, 1859–1865
William Murray (New York politician) (1803–1875), U.S. Representative from New York
William Murray (New Zealand politician) (1832–1900), New Zealand politician
William Murray (Ontario politician) (1839–1898), 19th-century Canadian politician
Bill Murray (CIA officer), American CIA officer
William Francis Murray (1881–1918), U.S. Representative from Massachusetts
William H. Murray (1869–1956), American politician from Oklahoma
William Harvey Murray (1916–1991), political figure in British Columbia, Canada
William J. Murray (politician) (c. 1884–1966), New York state senator 1937–1944
William Pitt Murray (1825–1910), American lawyer and politician
William Vans Murray (1760–1803), U.S. Representative from Maryland

Arts and entertainment
William Henry Murray (1790–1852), Scottish actor and theatre manager
Billy Murray (singer) (1877–1954), Irish-American singer
William Staite Murray (1881–1962), British studio potter
William Murray (musician) (died 1998), Scottish drummer and photographer
William B. Murray (born 1935), opera baritone
Billy Murray (actor) (born 1941), English actor
Bill Murray (born 1950), American actor
William Murray (writer) (1926–2005), American writer of mystery novels
Will Murray (born 1953), author and scholar of pulp fiction
Bill Murray (cartoonist) (born 1955), American cartoonist
William Grant Murray (1877–1950), British art teacher, gallery curator and artist

Religion
William Henry Harrison Murray (1840–1904), American clergyman, author, and promoter of outdoor pursuits
William J. Murray (born 1946), American Christian author and evangelist
William Edward Murray (1920–2013), Australian prelate of the Roman Catholic Church
William Murray (bishop), 17th-century Anglican bishop

Other
William Murray (gardener) (1819–1901), South Australian pioneer gardener
William Daniel Murray (1908–1994), U.S. federal judge
William George Murray (1884–1975), main perpetrator of the Coniston massacre
William H. Murray (Medal of Honor) (1876–1923), American Medal of Honor recipient
William Mackintosh Murray (1831–1920), co-founder of D. & W. Murray Limited, Australian drapery wholesaler
William S. Murray (1873–1942), American engineer
William Robert Murray (1896–1990), New Zealand labourer, policeman and unionist
William Murray (educationist) (1912–1995), created the Ladybird Peter and Jane reading scheme
William Murray (died 1562), Scottish landowner
William Murray of Tullibardine (died 1583), his son, Scottish courtier
William Murray (valet), Scottish courtier
William M. Murray (engineer), American engineer
R William Murray, American chief executive
"William Murray", an alias briefly used by Monk Eastman

See also
Billy Murray (disambiguation)
Will Murray (disambiguation)